Love Songs is a "best of" album by the French Rumba Catalana band Gipsy Kings, which was released in 1996.  It includes the new unreleased song "Gitano Soy". A US release of this album has been released in 1998 for USA audience under the name Cantos de Amor.

Track listing

References

External links
Love Songs at Discogs

Gipsy Kings albums
1996 compilation albums